In communication, a code word is an element of a standardized code or protocol. Each code word is assembled in accordance with the specific rules of the code and assigned a unique meaning. Code words are typically used for reasons of reliability, clarity, brevity, or secrecy.

See also 
 Code word (figure of speech)
 Coded set
 Commercial code (communications)
 Compartmentalization (information security)
 Duress code
 Error correction and detection
 Marine VHF radio
 Password
 Safeword
 Spelling alphabet

References

UNHCR Procedure for Radio Communication

External links 
 UNHCR Procedure for Radio Communication

Data transmission
Cryptography